The 2000 Super League Grand Final was the third official Grand Final and the conclusive and championship-deciding game of 2000's Super League V. Held on Saturday 14 October 2000 at Old Trafford, Manchester, the game was played between St. Helens and Wigan Warriors. Wigan wore blue for the encounter and St Helens wore their traditional red and white. The match was refereed by Russell Smith of Castleford and played before a crowd of 58,132. In the end St Helens, inspired by their captain Chris Joynt, defeated Wigan Warriors 29–16.

Background

Tetleys Super League V reverted to 12 teams after Gateshead Thunder and Sheffield Eagles left the league although Huddersfield Giants subsequently became Huddersfield-Sheffield Giants and finished bottom for the third consecutive season. Wigan Warriors finished top for the first time since Super League III when they won the Grand Final.

Route to the Final

Wigan Warriors

St Helens

Match details

References

External links
2000 Super League Grand Final at rlphotos.com

Super League Grand Finals
St Helens R.F.C. matches
Wigan Warriors matches
Grand final